Sophie's World (Sofies verden) is a 1999 Norwegian drama–adventure film directed by Erik Gustavson and starring Silje Storstein as Sophie. It is an adaptation of the 1991 novel of the same name by Jostein Gaarder. Upon its release in 1999 it was the most expensive film to date in Norway.

It has since been released on DVD dubbed into German. An English-subtitled DVD was released in 2005 in the UK.

Cast
 Silje Storstein as Sofie Amundsen / Hilde Møller Knag
 Tomas von Brömssen as Alberto Knox
 Andrine Sæther as Sofie's mother
 Bjørn Floberg as Major Albert Knag
 Hans Alfredson as Socrates 
 Nils Vogt	as Lærer Jacobsen
 Minken Fosheim as Hilde's mother
 Edda Trandum Grjotheim as Jorunn
 Arne Haakenaasen Dahl as Georg / Mischa / Giovanni 
 Sullivan Lloyd Nordrum as Jørgen
 Kjersti Holmen as Fru Johnsen
 Jon Eivind Gullord as the guide in Greece

Box office
The film was the second highest-grossing Norwegian film for the year with admissions of 200,000 and a gross of 9.4 million Krone($1.3 million).

References

External links

1999 films
1990s adventure drama films
Films based on Norwegian novels
Films directed by Erik Gustavson
Films about philosophy
Norwegian adventure drama films
1999 drama films